Christ and the Canaanite Woman is a 1594-1595 oil on canvas painting by Annibale Carracci, now in the Pinacoteca Stuard in Parma.

The work was mentioned by Carlo Cesare Malvasia, who, in Felsina Pittrice, called it "the famous Canaanite Woman. Giovanni Pietro Bellori wrote that "For the chapel of the same palazzo [i.e. Palazzo Farnese] he painted the painting of the Canaanite Woman, prostrate before Christ in an act of supplication; mentioning that she, the dog, who eats the crumbs, whilst Christ assures the woman with his hand, and approves her great faith. These two figures are in front of a view of trees with distant rural buildings, and it is a great shame that it is in such a poor condition, celebrated for its beauty".

Gallery

See also
 Exorcism of the Syrophoenician woman's daughter
 Matthew 15:27

References

1595 paintings
Paintings by Annibale Carracci
Paintings in Parma
Paintings depicting Jesus
Paintings depicting New Testament people